Tom Kljun (born 29 January 2004) is a Slovenian professional footballer who plays as a winger for Serie A side Lecce.

Club career 
Kljun is a youth product of Celje, where he signed his first professional contract in January 2020, before making his professional debut on 5 June, as he came on as a substitute for Luka Kerin in the injury time of a 2–0 PrvaLiga win against Rudar Velenje. At 16 years, 4 months and 7 days, he became the youngest ever player to feature for Celje in a league match. The club eventually went on to win the national title at the end of the same season.

In July 2021, Kljun joined fellow Slovenian side Tabor Sežana on a permanent deal.

On 17 January 2023, it was officially announced that Kljun agreed to join Serie A side Lecce for an undisclosed fee, being initially assigned to the club's under-19 team.

International career 
Kljun has represented Slovenia at all youth international levels up to the under-19 national team.

Honours
Celje
Slovenian PrvaLiga: 2019–20

References

External links 
 Tom Kljun at NZS 
 
 

2004 births
Living people
Slovenian footballers
Slovenia youth international footballers
Association football wingers
NK Celje players
NK Tabor Sežana players
U.S. Lecce players
Slovenian PrvaLiga players

Slovenian expatriate footballers
Expatriate footballers in Italy
Slovenian expatriate sportspeople in Italy